Ilya Nikolaevich Bondarenko is a former Russian motorcycle speedway rider.

Biography 
Born 16 February 1982 in Togliatti, his brother Pavel is also a speedway rider, and their uncle Anatoliy Bondarenko was twice world ice speedway champion.

Bondarenko first represented Russia in 2006. In 2011 he rode for Leicester Lions in the British Premier League.

Career

Russian league
Vostok ( Vladivostok ) - 1998
Mega-Lada ( Togliatti ) - 1999-2009
Oktiabrskiy ( Oktiabrskiy ) - from 2010

Polish league 
Lokomotiv ( Daugavpils ) - 2007-2008
Kolejarz ( Opole ) - 2009-2010

Ukrainian Premier League 
Kaskad ( Rivne ) - 2009-2010

British Premier League 
Leicester Lions - 2011

Sporting achievements 

Three-time champion of Russia in the team and individual competition among youths - 1997, 1998, 1999
Bronze medalist of the individual competition of the Russian Individual Speedway Championship - 2004, 2009
Team champion of Russia - 2001, 2002, 2003, 2004, 2005, 2006, 2007, 2008

See also 
 Russia national speedway team

References

1982 births
Living people
Russian speedway riders
Leicester Lions riders
Sportspeople from Tolyatti